Chapman Henry Hyams, Sr. (21 July 1838, in Charleston – 19 April 1923, in New York) was an American stockbroker, art collector, and philanthropist.

Family

On April 26, 1893, Hyams' son, Chapman Henry Hyams, Jr. married Violet Victoria Hildreth.  Their wedding took place in New York City.  On August 21, 1899, their son, Chapman Henry, 3rd, was born in New London, Connecticut.

New Orleans Museum of Art
When the New Orleans Museum of Art opened in 1911 Hyams loaned over 20 paintings for the opening,  some of which were later donated outright.

Donated paintings
The donated paintings include the following:
 Whisperings of Love by William-Adolphe Bouguereau
 The Snake Charmer (Charmeur de Serpents''') by Jean-Léon Gérôme
 Turkish Bashi Bazouk Mercenaries Playing Chess in a Market Place also by Gérôme
 The Cardinal's Friendly Chat by Jehan Georges Vibert
 Shrine of Venus by Sir Lawrence Alma-Tadema

Mausoleum
Hyams had a mausoleum built to house family remains in the Metairie Cemetery, New Orleans, the marble statuary monument to his sisters based on William Wetmore Story's Angel of Grief''. Hyams was eventually interred in the family mausoleum himself.  The mausoleum, designed by Favrot & Livaudais is in the style of a Greek temple with Ionic columns on all sides, and a pediment, with Hyams' name below.  The interior is illuminated by four blue stained glass windows, with floral theme.

References

External links

Businesspeople from New Orleans
American stockbrokers
American philanthropists
1869 births
1948 deaths
American art collectors
Burials at Metairie Cemetery